Pirava is a village in the municipality of Valandovo, North Macedonia.

Demographics
According to the 2002 census, the village had a total of 1844 inhabitants. Ethnic groups in the village include:

Macedonians: 1834
Romani: 2
Serbs: 8
Others: 2

References

External links

Villages in Valandovo Municipality